The cinema of Liberia, or Liberian cinema, refers to the filmmaking industry in Liberia.

Liberian cinema was impacted by the civil war, when the last cinema was closed in the 1990s. Liberia's capital, Monrovia, had three cinemas, with only one still in existence today. Since the end of the Ebola epidemic, the country's first art-house cinema was scheduled to be opened and operated by Kriterion Monrovia, after the ban on gatherings was lifted.

See also
 Media of Liberia

References